The Battle of Erastfer (also Battle of Errestfer, Battle of Erastvere) took place on 29 December 1701 (O.S.) / 30 December 1701 (Swedish calendar) / 9 January / 1702 (N.S.) near Erastfer in eastern Swedish Livonia (present-day Erastvere in Estonia) between a Russian force of around 13,000 regulars along with 6,000 irregulars led by general Boris Sheremetev and a Swedish force of about 3,470 men (at least 1,000 men were absent from the ranks for various reasons on the day of the battle, resulting in an actual fighting force of about 2,200–2,470 men), under the command of Wolmar Anton von Schlippenbach. The Swedes were defeated, with a loss of 1,000 men killed and captured along with all their artillery pieces. The Russians sustained about 1,000 killed along with another 2,000 wounded (according to a Russian soldier who later admitted, after being captured by the Swedes, to 3,000 total losses).

Aftermath 

Although Sheremetev pulled back to Pskov after the battle, the next year he fought the Swedes again under Schlippenbach in the battle of Hummelshof.

Before invading Ingria, Tsar Peter I secured Poland's continued participation in the war against Sweden by promising King Augustus II of Poland, 20,000 Russian troops, 100,000 pounds of gunpowder, and 100,000 rubles per year over three years.

Celebration
It was the first significant Russian victory in the Great Northern War. Peter I considered the battle a turning point - the first ever Russian victory against the Swedes in a field battle. Along with a gift of the tsars portrait adorned with diamonds, Sheremetev was elevated to general feldmarshall. All of the participating officers were gifted money and regular soldiers a freshly minted silver ducat. In Moscow a huge victory celebration was held, along with cannon volleys, thanksgiving services, and free wine, beer, mead and vodka. A firework ended the celebration in the evening.

References

Erastfer
Battles in Estonia
Erastfer
Erastfer
1701 in Europe
Conflicts in 1701
Kanepi Parish
18th century in Estonia